Mario Brodmann (born April 24, 1966) is a former Swiss professional ice hockey forward who last played for EHC Chur in Switzerland's National League B.

Brodmann has participated as a member of the Swiss national team in numerous international tournaments, including the 1992 Winter Olympics.

Career statistics

References

External links

Living people
Swiss ice hockey forwards
1966 births
Ice hockey players at the 1992 Winter Olympics
Olympic ice hockey players of Switzerland
ZSC Lions players
ECH Chur players
EV Zug players
HC Davos players
HC Fribourg-Gottéron players